QOF may refer to:
Qoph, a letter
Quality and Outcomes Framework, in UK primary health care.